Pisanella is a genus of sea snails, marine gastropod mollusks in the family Cancellariidae, the nutmeg snails.

Species
Species within the genus Pisanella include:

 Pisanella antiquata (Hinds, 1844): synonym of Tritonoharpa antiquata

References

 Hemmen J. (2007). Recent Cancellariidae. Wiesbaden, 428pp

Cancellariidae
Monotypic gastropod genera